Frantz is a German surname, and may refer to:

 Adrienne Frantz (born 1978), American actress
 Alison Frantz (1903–1995), American archaeologist
 Art Frantz (1921–2008), American baseball umpire
 Chris Frantz (born 1951), American musician
 Dan Frantz (born 1977), American footballer
 Ferdinand Frantz (1906–1959), German singer
 Frank Frantz (1872–1941), American politician
 Harry W. Frantz (1891–1982), American newspaper editor
 Gotthard Frantz (1888–1973), German general during World War II
 Joseph Frantz (soldier) (1837–1913), soldier in the American Civil War
 Justus Frantz (born 1944), German pianist
Marge Frantz (1922–2015), American activist and women's studies academic
 Mike Frantz (born 1986), German footballer
 Milane Frantz (born 1970), American billionaire heir
 Nicolas Frantz (1899–1985), Luxembourgian cyclist
 Paris Frantz, Miss Continental 1996
 Paul Frantz (1927–2016), French football manager
 Scott Frantz (born 1960), Connecticut politician and businessman
 Tom Frantz (born 1943), American race car driver
 Virginia Kneeland Frantz (1896–1967), American pathologist

See also 
 Franz (disambiguation)
 Franz (given name)